The Saga of Mayflower May is Marissa Nadler's second full-length studio album, released in 2005 on US label Eclipse Records, and distributed later that year in Europe by British label Beautiful Happiness. The album followed the breakup of her relationship with her previous collaborator, Myles Baer. She explained, "Heartbreak was like water to a plant for my songwriting. I hate to say it was one of the times where I was feeling the most manic and the most inspired".

Track listing
All songs written by Marissa Nadler.
 "Under an Old Umbrella" – 4:13
 "The Little Famous Song" – 3:14
 "Mr. John Lee (Velveteen Rose)" - 3:34
 "Damsels in the Dark" - 1:37
 "Lily, Henry, and the Willow Trees" - 2:45
 "Yellow Lights" - 2:54
 "Old Love Haunts Me in the Morning" - 3:07
 "My Little Lark" - 2:54
 "In the Time of the Lorry Low" - 3:04
 "Calico" - 3:30
 "Horses and Their Kin" - 4:30

Credits

Musicians
Marissa Nadler - guitar, vocals, 12-string guitar, background vocals. 
Brian McTear - Hammond organ on "Mr. John Lee", "Yellow Lights" and "My Little Lark"
Nick Castro - tin whistle on "The Little Famous Song", piano on "Old Love Haunts Me in the Morning"

Production
 Recorded at Miner Street/Cycle Sound Studios, Philadelphia, PA. December 2004
 Recorded, mixed and produced by Brian McTear and Amy Morrissey
 Mastered by Paul Hammond and Paul Sinclair at Fat City, Blue Bell, PA

References

External links
Marissa Nadler Official Site

2005 albums
Marissa Nadler albums